A. pomorum may refer to:

Acetobacter pomorum, a Gram-negative bacterium.
Alicyclobacillus pomorum, a Gram-positive bacterium.
Ampedus pomorum, a species of click beetle.
Anthonomus pomorum, a species of weevil that feeds on apple trees.